The episode list for the television series Honey, I Shrunk the Kids: The TV Show, based on the feature films. The series premiered on September 1, 1997 and ended on May 20, 2000 with 66 episodes spanning 3 seasons.

Currently, the series has been released on DVD in some regions.

Series overview

Episodes

Season 1 (1997–98)

Season 2 (1998–99)

Season 3 (1999–2000)

References

External links

Lists of American children's television series episodes
Lists of American sitcom episodes
Honey, I Shrunk the Kids (franchise) mass media
Lists of Disney television series episodes